Leicestershire Fire and Rescue Service is the fire and rescue service which serves the ceremonial counties of Leicestershire and Rutland in England. The service's headquarters are in Birstall, on the outskirts of Leicester.

History
The Leicestershire and Rutland Fire Brigade and the separate City of Leicester Fire Brigade were created in 1948 by the Fire Services Act 1947. In 1974 the City of Leicester brigade was merged with the Leicestershire and Rutland brigade to form the present fire service.

Since Rutland and the City of Leicester became unitary authorities in the 1990s, the fire authority which administers the service is a joint-board made up of representatives from Leicester City Council, Leicestershire County Council and Rutland County Council.

Performance
In 2018/2019, every fire and rescue service in England and Wales was subjected to a statutory inspection by Her Majesty's Inspectorate of Constabulary and Fire & Rescue Services (HIMCFRS). The inspection investigated how well the service performs in each of three areas. On a scale of outstanding, good, requires improvement and inadequate, Leicestershire Fire and Rescue Service was rated as follows:

Fire stations and appliances 
LFRS operates 20 fire stations that are crewed on a combination of duty systems:
 Wholetime   firefighters crew the station 24/7
 Day-crewed  firefighters crew the station during daytime
 Day-crewing Plus  firefighter self roster their own working routine and can be on duty on station for up to five days and nights in a row
 On-call  retained firefighters remain on-call in the local area and respond when needed, whether at home or work

See also
List of British firefighters killed in the line of duty

References

External links

Leicestershire Fire and Rescue Service at HMICFRS

Fire and rescue services of England
Organisations based in Leicestershire
Leicester
Organisations based in Rutland